Helen Margaret Muspratt (13 May 1907 – 29 July 2001) was a British photographer.

Early life and education

Born in Madras, India, to British Army Lieutenant-Colonel Vivian Edward Muspratt and his wife, Lily May, née Hope. She studied photography at Regent Street Polytechnic.

Photography career

Muspratt opened a photography studio in Swanage, Dorset in 1929. In 1932, she met Lettice Ramsey, and together they opened the Ramsey & Muspratt studio in Cambridge.

Early in her career, Muspratt pursued both portraiture (especially of children) and experimental work; her solarization studies were influenced by the American artist Man Ray. Her documentary work included travel to the Soviet Union in 1936 to photograph farmers and villagers along the Volga; upon her return, she joined the Communist Party in Britain. Commissioned by the Left Book Club in 1937, she photographed miners and unemployed labourers in the Rhondda valley in south Wales. In 1937, she opened a second Ramsey & Muspratt studio in Cornmarket Street, Oxford. The Oxford premises of Ramsey & Muspratt had been a studio opened by Walter Benington on behalf of Elliott & Fry. In Oxford, portraiture was the mainstay of her commercial work until her retirement in the 1970s.

In 1976, she held a retrospective exhibition of her work. Wider recognition came with the 1986–87 touring exhibition Women's Photography in Britain and the volume The Other Observers: Women Photographers in Britain-1900 to the present; in 1986, Channel 4 broadcast a documentary series on women photographers that featured Muspratt; she also appeared in the BBC series Women of Our Century in 1990.

Personal life

In 1937, she married Communist Party organiser Jack Dunman.

Death

Muspratt died on 29 July 2001 in Brighton, England.

Collections

Muspratt's work is held in the following permanent collection:
National Portrait Gallery, London holds fifteen of Muspratt's portrait photographs

Exhibitions

Pallant House Gallery, Chichester, 2016
Bodleian Libraries, Oxford, 2020, to mark the donation of Muspratt's archive to the Libraries

References

External links

https://www.helenmuspratt-photographer.com

Ramsey & Muspratt Gallery at Peter Lofts, successor to Ramsey & Muspratt in Post Office Terrace, Cambridge (1980).

1907 births
2001 deaths
20th-century British photographers
English women photographers
People from Chennai
Alumni of the University of Westminster
Photographers from Dorset
20th-century women photographers
Communist Party of Great Britain members
20th-century English women
20th-century English people